Google Authenticator is a software-based authenticator by Google that implements two-step verification services using the Time-based One-time Password Algorithm (TOTP; specified in RFC 6238) and HMAC-based One-time Password algorithm (HOTP; specified in RFC 4226), for authenticating users of software applications.

When logging into a site supporting Authenticator (including Google services) or using Authenticator-supporting third-party applications such as password managers or file hosting services, Authenticator generates a six- to eight-digit one-time password which users must enter in addition to their usual login details.

Google provides Android, BlackBerry, and iOS versions of Authenticator.

An official open-source fork of the Android app is available on GitHub. However, this fork has not been updated since 2020. Likewise, for old versions of the Google Authenticator apps for iOS and BlackBerry, the source code is also freely available. Yet this source code, too, has not been updated in years.

Current releases of the software are proprietary freeware.

Typical use case
To use Authenticator, the app is first installed on a smartphone. It must be set up for each site with which it is to be used: the site provides a shared secret key to the user over a secure channel, to be stored in the Authenticator app. This secret key will be used for all future logins to the site.

To log into a site or service that uses two-factor authentication and supports Authenticator, the user provides a username and password to the site. The site then computes (but does not display) the required six-digit one-time password and asks the user to enter it. The user runs the Authenticator app, which independently computes and displays the same password, which the user types in, authenticating their identity.

With this kind of two-factor authentication, mere knowledge of username and password is insufficient to break into a user's account - the attacker also needs knowledge of the shared secret key, or physical access to the device running the Authenticator app. An alternative route of attack is a man-in-the-middle attack: if the computer used for the login process is compromised by a trojan, then username, password, and the one-time password can be captured by the trojan, which then can initiate its own login session to the site, or monitor and modify the communication between the user and the site.

Technical description
During setup, the service provider generates an 80-bit secret key for each user (whereas RFC 4226 §4 requires 128 bits and recommends 160 bits). This is transferred to the Authenticator app as a 16, 26 or 32 character base32 string, or as a QR code.

Subsequently, when the user opens the Authenticator app, it calculates an HMAC-SHA1 hash value using this secret key. The message can be:
 the number of 30-second periods since the Unix epoch (TOTP); or
 a counter that is incremented with each new code (HOTP).

A portion of the HMAC is extracted and displayed to the user as a six digit code.

Source code license

The Google Authenticator app for Android was originally open source, but later became proprietary. Google made earlier source for their Authenticator app available on its GitHub repository; the associated development page stated:

"This open source project allows you to download the code that powered version 2.21 of the application. Subsequent versions contain Google-specific workflows that are not part of the project."

The latest open-source release was in 2020.

Following Google Authenticator ceasing to be open source, a free-software clone was created, predominantly a fresh rewrite but including some code from the original. The currently-maintained fork of this clone is called FreeOTP+.

See also

Multi-factor authentication
HMAC-based one-time password
FreeOTP
LinOTP
Comparison of TOTP applications

References

External links
Google Authenticator on Google Help
Google Authenticator (Android) and Google Authenticator (other) legacy source code on GitHub
Google Authenticator PAM module source code on GitHub
Google Authenticator implementation in Python on Stack Overflow
Authenticator on F-Droid
Django-MFA Implementation Using Google Authenticator - Django-MFA is a simple package to add an extra layer of security to your Django web application. It gives your web app a randomly changing password as extra protection.
 Source code of version 1.02 on GitHub

Computer access control
Authenticator
Computer-related introductions in 2010